Statistics of the Scottish Football League in season 2009–10.

Scottish First Division

Playoffs

Scottish Second Division

Play-Offs

Scottish Third Division

See also
2009–10 in Scottish football

References

 
Scottish Football League seasons